Sean Walker may refer to:

Sean Walker (racing driver) (born 1958), British auto racing driver
Sean Walker, a fictional character portrayed by Jason Ritter in NBC's The Event
Sean Walker (ice hockey) (born 1994), Canadian ice hockey player